Vincent Estève (born 21 July 1945 in Meknès) is a retired professional French footballer who played defender.

He played for AS Cannes, FC Nantes, SC Toulon.

External links

Profile on French federation official site

1945 births
Living people
French footballers
France international footballers
Association football defenders
AS Cannes players
FC Nantes players
SC Toulon players
Ligue 1 players
Ligue 2 players
People from Meknes